Alive in You is the first studio album by Christian rock band 7eventh Time Down, released on September 13, 2011.

Track listing

Singles 

"Alive in You" and "What About Tonight" were released as singles. "Alive in You" charted at number 46 on the Billboard Hot Christian Songs chart, and "What About Tonight" charted at number 26 on the Christian rock chart.

References 

2011 debut albums
7eventh Time Down albums
BEC Recordings albums
Tooth & Nail Records albums